The Sullivan and Richie Jean Jackson House, at 1416 Lapsley Ave. in Selma, Alabama, was listed on the National Register of Historic Places in 2014.

It is a one-story wood frame bungalow which was built in 1906 and was remodeled around 1960.  It has wide-board siding and a metal pyramid roof, and is built upon a brick and concrete foundation.

References

National Register of Historic Places in Dallas County, Alabama
Buildings and structures in Alabama